The 2022–23 season was the 68th season of TRAU FC in existence and fourth season in the I-League. This season of the I-League witnesses the return of the home-away format of the matches similar to that of the 2019–20 I-League season after a break of two years due to the COVID-19 pandemic in the country.

First-team squad

Transfers in

Transfers out

Pre-season and friendlies

Competitions

I-League

League table

Matches

Durand Cup

Group C

Matches

Super Cup 

After finishing 4th in the I-League, Malabarians will have to play a qualifier against 7th-ranked Aizawl to earn a place in the group stage.

Qualifiers

Statistics

Goal Scorers

References

2022–23 I-League by team
TRAU FC seasons